The Gujarat Urja Vikas Nigam Limited (GUVNL) is a state electricity regulation board in the state of Gujarat in India. It is wholly owned by the Government of Gujarat. It was set up in May 1999 and is registered under the Companies Act, 1956. The company was created by the Gujarat Electricity Board (GEB) as its wholly owned subsidiary in the context of liberalization and as a part of efforts towards restructuring of the power sector with the aim of improving efficiency in management and delivery of services to consumers. As a part of power reform process, the Electricity Act, 2003, was passed by the Central Government and Gujarat Electricity Industry (Re-organization & Regulation) Act, 2003, was passed by the Government of Gujarat to restructure the electricity industry with an aim to improve efficiency in management and delivery of services to consumers.

The Government of Gujarat framed the Gujarat Electricity Industry Re-organization & Comprehensive Transfer Scheme, 2003, (the Transfer Scheme) vide Government Notification dated 24-10-2003 for transfer of assets/liabilities etc. of erstwhile Gujarat Electricity Board (GEB) to the successor entities. Accordingly GEB was reorganized effective from 1 April 2005 into seven companies with functional responsibilities of trading, generation, transmission and distribution.

The Companies incorporated are as under:

 
The Gujarat Urja Vikas Nigam Limited was incorporated as a Gujarat Electricity Board. Since 100% Shares in the other six companies are held by GUVNL w.e.f 1 April 2005 they have become Subsidiary Companies of GUVNL as per the provisions of the Companies Act,1956.

The GUVNL is engaged in the business of bulk purchase and sale of electricity, Supervision, Co-ordination and facilitation of the activities of its six Subsidiary Companies. The GSECL is engaged in the business of Generation of Electricity. The GETCO is engaged in the business of Transmission of Electricity. The UGVCL, DGVCL, MGVCL and PGVCL are engaged in the business of Distribution of Electricity in the Northern, Southern, Central and Western areas of Gujarat respectively.

Functions of GUVNL
The Company was incorporated to take over the assets, liabilities and personnel of the GEB in accordance with Schedule G of the Main Transfer Scheme Notification dated 24 October 2003. The Company has to carry out the residual functions (including power trading) of the defunct GEB.

One of the functions of the Company includes coordination of the activities of its subsidiaries, business, and works to determine their economic and financial objectives and targets and to review, control, guide and direct their performance with a view to secure optimum utilization of all resources placed at their disposal.

Subsidiary companies
 Gujarat State Electricity Corporation Limited (GSEC)
 Gujarat Energy Transmission Corporation Limited (GETCO)
 State Load Dispatch Center (SLDC)
 Dakshin Gujarat Vij Company Limited (DGVCL)
 Madhya Gujarat Vij Company Limited (MGVCL)
 Paschim Gujarat Vij Company Limited (PGVCL)
 Uttar Gujarat Vij Company Limited (UGVCL)

External links

State electricity agencies of Gujarat
Energy companies established in 1999
1999 establishments in Gujarat
Indian companies established in 1999